The following highways are numbered 657:

Canada

United States